Solid-state storage (SSS) is a type of non-volatile computer storage that stores and retrieves digital information using only electronic circuits, without any involvement of moving mechanical parts.  This differs fundamentally from the traditional electromechanical storage, which records data using rotating or linearly moving media coated with magnetic material.

Solid-state storage devices typically store data using electrically-programmable non-volatile flash memory, however some devices use battery-backed volatile random-access memory (RAM). Having no moving mechanical parts, solid-state storage is much faster than traditional electromechanical storage; as a downside, solid-state storage is significantly more expensive and suffers from the write amplification phenomenon.

Solid-state storage devices come in various types, form factors, sizes of storage space, and interfacing options to satisfy application requirements for many different types of computer systems and appliances.

Overview 
Historically, secondary storage in computer systems has been implemented primarily by using magnetic properties of the surface coatings applied to rotating platters (in hard disk drives and floppy disks) or linearly moving narrow strips of plastic film (in tape drives).  Pairing such magnetic media with read/write heads allows data to be written by separately magnetizing small sections of the ferromagnetic coating, and read later by detecting the transitions in magnetization.  For the data to be read or written, exact sections of the magnetic media need to pass under the read/write heads that flow closely to the media surface; as a result, reading or writing data imposes delays required for the positioning of magnetic media and heads, with the delays differing depending on the actual technology.

Over time, the performance gap between the central processing units (CPUs) and electromechanical storage (hard disk drives and their RAID setups) widened, requiring advancements in the secondary storage technology.  A solution was found in flash memory, which is an electronic non-volatile computer storage medium that can be electrically erased and reprogrammed.  Solid-state storage typically uses the NAND type of flash memory, which may be written and read in chunks much smaller than the entire size of the storage device.  The size of a minimal chunk (page) for read operations is much smaller than the minimal chunk size (block) for write/erase operations, resulting in an undesirable phenomenon called write amplification that limits the random write performance and write endurance of flash-based solid-state storage devices.  Another type of solid-state storage devices uses volatile random-access memory (RAM) combined with a battery that allows the contents of RAM to be preserved for a limited amount of time after the device's power supply is interrupted.  As an advantage, RAM-based solid-state storage is much faster compared to flash, and does not experience write amplification.

As a result of having no moving mechanical parts, solid-state storage virtually eliminates the data access latencies present in electromechanical storage devices, and allows significantly higher rates of I/O operations per second (IOPS).  Additionally, solid-state storage allows much faster sequential access to stored data, consumes less power, has better physical shock resistance, and produces less heat and no vibrations during operation.  As a downside, solid-state storage devices have much higher per-megabyte prices than electromechanical storage devices, and generally come in significantly smaller per-device capacities.  Moreover, flash-based devices experience the memory wear that reduces their service life by imposing a limited amount of data that may be written to them, resulting from the limitations of flash memory that impose a finite number of program–erase cycles used to write data.  As a result, solid-state storage is frequently used for the creation of hybrid drives, in which solid-state storage serves as a cache for frequently accessed data instead of being a complete substitute for the traditional secondary storage.

Device types 

Solid-state storage devices serve as secondary storage components for more complex systems, which may range from embedded and portable devices to large servers and dedicated network-attached storage (NAS) systems.  As a result, solid-state storage devices exist in different capacities, physical layouts and dimensions, using various interfaces and providing different feature sets.  Less complex solid-state storage devices such as memory cards use simpler, slower interfaces such as the one-bit SD interface or SPI, while more sophisticated high-performance devices use faster interfaces such as Serial ATA (SATA) or PCI Express (PCIe) paired with logical device interfaces such as AHCI or NVM Express (NVMe).

Types of flash-based solid-state storage devices include the following:
 MultiMediaCard (MMC) a memory card type used in portable devices
 Secure Digital (SD) a memory card type available in different variants, speeds and sizes, used extensively in portable devices
 Solid-state drive (SSD) a computer storage device available in various form factors, with different interfaces, and in various classes targeting different market segments
 USB flash drive pocketable removable storage devices that interface through USB, available in various shapes and sizes

See also 

 Drum memory a magnetic data storage device used as the main working memory in many early computers
 i-RAM a DRAM-based solid-state storage device produced by Gigabyte, operating as a SATA hard disk drive
 Magnetic storage the concept of storing data on a magnetised medium using different patterns of magnetisation
 RAM drive a block of random-access memory that the operating system treats as if it were secondary storage
 Sequential access memory a class of data storage devices that read stored data in a sequence
 Wear leveling a technique for prolonging the service life of some kinds of erasable computer storage media, such as flash memory

References

External links 
 Solid-State Storage: Technology, Design and Applications, IBM, May 4, 2010, by Richard Freitas and Lawrence Chiu
 USB Flash Wear Leveling and Life Span FAQ, Corsair, June 2007, archived from the original on October 13, 2007

Solid-state computer storage